Chkalovskoye is a rural locality (a village) in Kaltovsky Selsoviet, Iglinsky District, Bashkortostan, Russia. The population was 134 as of 2010. There are three streets.

Geography 
Chkalovskoye is located 37 km southeast of Iglino (the district's administrative centre) by road. Leninskoye is the nearest rural locality.

References 

Rural localities in Iglinsky District